Sin pecado concebido (English: Blameless Love) is a Mexican telenovela produced by José Alberto Castro for Televisa in 2001.

The telenovela stars Angélica Rivera, Carlos Ponce, Sergio Goyri, Itatí Cantoral and María Sorté.

Cast

Main

 Angélica Rivera as Mariana Campos Ortiz
 Carlos Ponce as Adrián Martorel Ibáñez
 Sergio Goyri as Emiliano Martorel Ochoa
 Itatí Cantoral as Raquel Villavicencio Serrano
 María Sorté as Amparo Ibáñez de Martorel

Also Main

 Beatriz Aguirre as Doña Salud Rojas vda. de Villavicencio
 Joaquín Cordero as Padre Gonzalo
 Magda Guzmán as Eva Santana
 Aurora Molina as Madre Ángeles
 Pilar Pellicer as Dolores "Loló" de la Barcena y de Teresa
 Rosa María Bianchi as Dra. Carmen Albán
 David Ostrosky as Diego Enrique Castellanos
 Ana Bertha Espín as Flor Gutiérrez de Martorel
 Andrea Torre as Arcelia Guizar Albán
 Gerardo Albarrán as Ing. Raúl Platas
 Roxana Saucedo as Dr. Mendoza
 Mané Macedo as Reyna
 Juan Carlos Casasola as Sergio Orozco
 Sebastián Rulli as Marco Vinicio Martorel Gutiérrez
 Ivonne Corona as Ana Luisa Ortiz de Campos
 Rafael Amaya as Cástulo Campos Ortiz
 José Antonio Ferral as Lupe
 Luis Roberto Guzmán as Álvaro Godoy
 Montserrat Oliver as Monserrat España
 Juan Soler as Octavio Allende

Supporting cast
 Orlando Carrió as Claudio Martorel Ochoa
 Juan Peláez as Anselmo Campos
 Delia Casanova as Hermana Jovita
 Roberto Ballesteros as Teniente Epigmenio Nava
 Luis Gatica as Dr. Gerardo Garduño

Awards and nominations

References

External links 
 

2001 telenovelas
Mexican telenovelas
2001 Mexican television series debuts
2001 Mexican television series endings
Televisa telenovelas
Spanish-language telenovelas